The Tunnel Tiergarten Spreebogen is a 2.4 km long road tunnel in Berlin which connects Berlin Hauptbahnhof and Tiergarten. It is known as Tiergartentunnel.

Each section has two lanes and a narrow standing strip. At the northern end there are access roads to Minna-Cauer-Straße and Invalidenstraße. The southern access roads are on Tiergartenstraße and the Reichpietschufer / George C. Marshall Bridge. It is part of the Bundesstraße 96 and the Inner Ring Road (Innenstadtring).

It was opened on 26 March 2006. Construction began in 2002. A similar tunnel is the SMART Tunnel in Kuala Lumpur.

In popular culture
In 2004 – two years before it commissioned, the tunnel was used for filming The Bourne Supremacy, it provides several vehicles in the killing spree. It plays in Moscow, but its shot in Berlin.

External links
 Tunnel Tiergarten Spreebogen – TTS (PDF; 1,9 MB) Map of the Tunnel Tiergarten Spreebogen
 Opening of the road tunnel on 26 March 2006

Road tunnels in Germany
Moabit
Roads in Berlin
Buildings and structures in Mitte